Dr Karol Galba (2 February 1921 – 15 November 2009) was football official, probably best known for being a linesman during the 1966 FIFA World Cup Final at Wembley Stadium.

Background

Galba, a Slovak, was an experienced referee who had officiated at the 1962 FIFA World Cup and was, in charge of the Feyenoord vs Real Madrid tie on 8 September 1965 in which he brought an end to the match early in order to avoid a mass melee after the Spanish player Miera fouled Coen Moulijn. Galba became President of the UEFA Referees' Committee when it was first instituted in 1968. He later worked as a match observer for UEFA.

He received the UEFA Order of Merit in Ruby.

References
Karol Galba's obituary

1921 births
2009 deaths
FIFA World Cup referees
Slovak football referees
FIFA World Cup Final match officials
1966 FIFA World Cup referees
1962 FIFA World Cup referees
Czechoslovak football referees
Olympic football referees